The 2012 Schleswig-Holstein state election was held on 6 May 2012 to elect the members of the Landtag of Schleswig-Holstein. The incumbent coalition government of the Christian Democratic Union and Free Democratic Party (FDP) was defeated. Though the CDU remained the largest party, the Social Democratic Party (SPD) negotiated a coalition with The Greens and the South Schleswig Voters' Association (SSW). This was dubbed the "Danish traffic light"  or "Namibia coalition". SPD leader Torsten Albig was subsequently elected Minister-President by the Landtag.

Background
After the 2009 state election, the CDU formed a coalition with the FDP under Minister-President Peter Harry Carstensen. Due to ambiguity and complications with the electoral law, the election result was the subject of a legal challenge by the Greens, SSW, and The Left. In August 2010, the state Constitutional Court ruled that the electoral law was unconstitutional. The court mandated that a new electoral law be legislated within six months and that new elections be held by September 2012, two years ahead of schedule.

Minister-President Carstensen had stated his intention to retire at the next election. The CDU therefore needed to pick a candidate to succeed him as Minister-President if they won the election. At a party conference in May 2011, they chose Christian von Boetticher, incumbent deputy Minister-President and leader of the CDU parliamentary group. In August, however, von Boetticher resigned these positions after it was revealed that he had been involved in an intimate relationship with a 16-year-old girl as recently as 2010. Two days later, the CDU announced that Minister of Science, Economic Affairs and Transport Jost de Jager had been nominated as their new candidate for Minister-President.

Parties
The table below lists parties represented in the previous Landtag of Schleswig-Holstein.

Opinion polling

Party polling

Minister-President polling

Election result

The SPD recovered some of the voteshare it had lost in the 2009 election while the CDU stagnated. This led to a very close result, with both parties winning 22 seats, but the CDU leading with 30.8% of the vote to the SPD's 30.4%. On paper, the FDP was the biggest loser of the election, almost halving its voteshare from its impressive showing in 2009. However, compared to the national trend, the Schleswig-Holstein result was an unexpected success; and until April, state polling had predicted that the FDP would lose all its seats. The Greens marginally improved their performance compared to 2009. The Left fared poorly, losing all its seats after only 3 years in the Landtag. The Pirate Party won 8.2%, entering the Landtag for the first time. This came after successes in the 2011 Berlin state election and 2012 Saarland state election in the preceding months. The SSW achieved its best result since 1950 with 4.6%.

|-
| colspan=8| 
|-
! colspan="2" | Party
! Votes
! %
! +/-
! Seats 
! +/-
! Seats %
|-
| bgcolor=| 
| align=left | Christian Democratic Union (CDU)
| align=right| 408,637
| align=right| 30.8
| align=right| 0.7
| align=right| 22
| align=right| 12
| align=right| 31.9
|-
| bgcolor=| 
| align=left | Social Democratic Party (SPD)
| align=right| 404,048
| align=right| 30.4
| align=right| 5.0
| align=right| 22
| align=right| 3
| align=right| 31.9
|-
| bgcolor=| 
| align=left | Alliance 90/The Greens (Grüne)
| align=right| 174,953
| align=right| 13.2
| align=right| 0.8
| align=right| 10
| align=right| 2
| align=right| 14.5
|-
| bgcolor=| 
| align=left | Free Democratic Party (FDP)
| align=right| 108,953
| align=right| 8.2
| align=right| 6.7
| align=right| 6
| align=right| 8
| align=right| 8.7
|-
| bgcolor=| 
| align=left | Pirate Party Germany (Piraten)
| align=right| 108,902
| align=right| 8.2
| align=right| 6.4
| align=right| 6
| align=right| 6
| align=right| 8.7
|-
| bgcolor=| 
| align=left | South Schleswig Voters' Association (SSW)
| align=right| 61,025
| align=right| 4.6
| align=right| 0.3
| align=right| 3
| align=right| 1
| align=right| 4.3
|-
! colspan=8|
|-
| bgcolor=| 
| align=left | The Left (Linke)
| align=right| 29,900
| align=right| 2.3
| align=right| 3.7
| align=right| 0
| align=right| 6
| align=right| 0
|-
| bgcolor=| 
| align=left | Family Party (Familie)
| align=right| 12,758
| align=right| 1.0
| align=right| 0.2
| align=right| 0
| align=right| ±0
| align=right| 0
|-
| bgcolor=|
| align=left | Others
| align=right| 19,276
| align=right| 1.5
| align=right| 
| align=right| 0
| align=right| ±0
| align=right| 0
|-
! align=right colspan=2| Total
! align=right| 1,328,452
! align=right| 100.0
! align=right| 
! align=right| 69
! align=right| 26
! align=right| 
|-
! align=right colspan=2| Voter turnout
! align=right| 
! align=right| 60.2
! align=right| 13.4
! align=right| 
! align=right| 
! align=right| 
|}

Outcome
The outgoing CDU–FDP government lost its majority, winning just 28 of the 35 seats needed for a majority. The SPD–Green bloc also fell short with 32 seats. CDU candidate Jost de Jager invited both the FDP and Greens to discuss a potential coalition, but neither party accepted. The SPD, Greens, and SSW began discussions for forming a government together. This was dubbed the "Danish traffic light", a play on the red-yellow-green "traffic light coalition", with the "yellow" FDP substituted for the "Danish" SSW. It would have a narrow, one-seat majority. This same arrangement had been attempted after the 2005 state election, but unexpectedly failed when one of the government members abstained. Pirate Party leader Torge Schmidt suggested that his party could lend their support to the Danish traffic light, though this never came to fruition.

Coalition talks succeeded, and the Landtag voted to confirm Torsten Albig as the new Minister-President. The government received 37 votes, meaning that at least two opposition members voted in favour.

References

2012 elections in Germany
Elections in Schleswig-Holstein
May 2012 events in Germany